The 2008–09 Euro Hockey League was the second season of the Euro Hockey League, Europe's premier club field hockey tournament organised by the EHF.

The final was played between UHC Hamburg and Bloemendaal at the Hazelaarweg Stadion in Rotterdam, Netherlands. Bloemendaal beat UHC Hamburg, the defending champions, 5–4 to win their first Euro Hockey League title. Rotterdam took the bronze medal.

Association team allocation

Association ranking

Teams

Round one
Pools A, B, C and D were played in Amstelveen, the Netherlands between 24 and 26 October 2008 and the other four pools were played in Lille, France. If a game was won, the winning team received 5 points. A draw resulted in both teams receiving 2 points. A loss gave the losing team 1 point unless the losing team lost by 3 or more goals, then they received 0 points.

Pool A

Pool B

Pool C

Pool D

Pool E

Pool F

Pool G

Pool H

Knockout stage
The round of 16 and the quarter-finals were played in Hamburg, Germany between 10 and 13 April 2009 and the semi-finals, third place match and the final were played in Rotterdam, the Netherlands between 30 and 31 May 2009.

Bracket

Round of 16

Quarter-finals

Semi-finals

Bronze medal match

Final

Statistics

Top goalscorers

External links
Official website

Euro Hockey League
2008–09 in European field hockey
October 2008 sports events in Europe
November 2008 sports events in Europe
April 2009 sports events in Europe
May 2009 sports events in Europe